Cruel Train (also known as The Beast in Man) is a British television crime drama, written and directed by Malcolm McKay, that first broadcast on BBC2 on 22 December 1996. Based on Émile Zola's 1890 novel La Bête humaine, and set during the Blitz, the film stars David Suchet as Ruben Roberts, a railway official who discovers that his wife, Selina (Saskia Reeves), was sexually abused as a child by the Chairman of the Line, Arthur Grandridge (David Belcher), who also happens to be her godfather. Assisted by Selina, Ruben plots to murder Grandridge on the Brighton Express.

Filming for Cruel Train took place at Pebble Mill Studios between 25 November and 22 December 1994, with a budget of £1.25 million. The set used was built entirely from scratch in a disused warehouse on the former GEC turbine and transformer works, which was demolished shortly after filming ceased. In 1996, Cruel Train was nominated in for the British Academy Television Craft Award for Best Original Television Music. Despite remaining commercially unreleased on VHS or DVD, Cruel Train is available to stream on  Amazon Prime Video in the United States.

Cast
 David Suchet as Ruben Roberts
 Saskia Reeves as Selina Roberts
 Adrian Dunbar as Jack Dando
 Alec McCowen as Supt. Fish
 Jonathan Moore as Sgt. Handy
 Richard Ridings as Percy Cotton
 Melanie Hill as Phyllis Pratt
 Vivienne Burgess as Mrs. Liddle
 Gerard Horan as Colin Caine
 Minnie Driver as Flora Mussell
 Bryan Pringle as Maurice Mussell
 Sheila Reid as Vera Mussell
 Patrick Godfrey as Mr. Davidson
 Steven Crossley as John Muster
 Paul McKay as Henry Holloway
 David Belcher	as Arthur Grandridge
 N15 class no. 777  as the locomotive

References

External links

1996 television films
1996 films
BBC television dramas
British television films
1990s English-language films
Television episodes about child sexual abuse